Tataho is a town and commune in Madagascar. It belongs to the district of Manakara, which is a part of Vatovavy-Fitovinany Region. The population of the commune was estimated to be approximately 4,000 in 2001 commune census.

Only primary schooling is available. It is also a site of industrial-scale  mining. Farming and raising livestock provides employment for 42.5% and 42.5% of the working population. The most important crop is lychee, while other important products are cloves, mango, cassava and oranges. Industry and services provide employment for 14% and 1% of the population, respectively.

References and notes 

Populated places in Vatovavy-Fitovinany